Crystal Lake is a lake located in Lida Township in Otter Tail County, Minnesota, USA.

Size and shape

Location
To the west is Lake Lizzie, which is connected to Crystal Lake by a navigable culvert under County Road 31. The larger Lake Lida lies close to the south of the lake, but is not connected directly. Smaller Lake Franklin is located to the northwest.

References

Lakes of Otter Tail County, Minnesota
Lakes of Minnesota